Danger Bird or Dangerbird may refer to:
Dangerbird Records, an American independent record label
"Danger Bird" (Neil Young song)
"Danger Bird", a song by Papas Fritas
Danger Bird, a character on Kirby Buckets